Arizona Cyclone is a 1941 American Western film directed by Joseph H. Lewis and written by Sherman L. Lowe. The film stars Johnny Mack Brown, Fuzzy Knight, Nell O'Day, Kathryn Adams Doty, Herbert Rawlinson and Dick Curtis. The film was released on November 14, 1941, by Universal Pictures.

Plot

Cast         
Johnny Mack Brown as Tom Baxter
Fuzzy Knight as Muleshoe
Nell O'Day as Claire Randolph
Kathryn Adams Doty as Elsie Graham
Herbert Rawlinson as George Randolph
Dick Curtis as Quirt Crenshaw
Robert Strange as Adam Draper
Glenn Strange as Roy Jessup
Carl Sepulveda as Waters
Chuck Morrison as Jack 
Buck Moulton as Nick
Jack Rube Clifford as Johnson

References

External links
 

1941 films
1940s English-language films
American Western (genre) films
1941 Western (genre) films
Universal Pictures films
Films directed by Joseph H. Lewis
American black-and-white films
1940s American films